Putney is a constituency created in 1918. It is currently represented in the House of Commons of the UK Parliament since 2019 by Fleur Anderson of the Labour Party. Putney was the only seat that Labour flipped during the 2019 general election.

Boundaries 

1918–1950: The Metropolitan Borough of Wandsworth wards of Putney and Southfields.

1950–1974: As above plus Fairfield ward.

1983–2010: The London Borough of Wandsworth wards of East Putney, Parkside, Roehampton, Southfields, Thamesfield, West Hill, and West Putney.

2010–present: As above less Parkside ward.

History 

When created in 1918 the constituency was carved out of the west of the abolished seat Wandsworth. The rest of the latter formed Wandsworth Central, Balham and Tooting and Streatham. Putney formed one of the divisions of the Parliamentary Borough of Wandsworth.

Political history
The seat was Conservative from 1918 until 1964, in a national context of Labour marginal wins in the 1920s, the landslide Labour victory in 1945 and the narrower Labour win in 1950.  After the Labour win of 1964, the fairly narrow Heath ministry win of 1970 failed to tip the seat back to the Conservative Party, and the seat was held by Labour for 15 years with Hugh Jenkins as MP.

Putney was next held by Conservative Secretary of State for National Heritage David Mellor from 1979 until 1997 during the party's successive national governments; the 1997 Labour landslide saw Putney gained by Tony Colman (Lab) and a signal early-declared result as the landslide unfolded.

Putney was the first Conservative gain on election night in 2005, when Justine Greening took back the seat from Labour on a two-party swing (Lab-Con) of 6.5%.  The 2015 result gave the seat the 148th most marginal majority of the Conservative Party's 331 seats by percentage of majority, similar to the 2010 result. The 2017 election saw Greening re-elected, but with a 10% swing to Labour; this heavy swing against the Conservatives has been attributed to the fact that the Borough of Wandsworth (of which Putney is part) voted 75% in favour of remaining in the European Union in the previous year's referendum. In 2019, it was the only seat in the country gained by Labour.

Constituency profile
Putney has long had many desirable properties of South-West London with Southfields to the south and the River Thames to the north with Fulham lying across the river.

The majority of the area as in the 19th century is covered by mid-to-high income neighbourhoods whereas the eastern boundary of the seat eating into Wandsworth town centre is more mixed, and Roehampton which has its university (University of Roehampton and part of the Kingston University campus) consists of, in terms of housing, by a small majority, a diverse council stock that owing to its cost has only fractionally been acquired under the Right to Buy — much of this ward remains in one form or another reliant on social housing.

The local council is not a bellwether of who will win the Putney seat, and for a considerable time has imposed the lowest council tax in the country. Between 1997 and 2005 Putney had a unique attribute of being the only seat in the country where every single component ward elected a full slate of Conservative councillors, yet the constituency had a Labour MP, Tony Colman.

In the 2016 EU Referendum, Putney voted 72.24% to Remain.

Members of Parliament

Elections

Elections in the 2010s

Elections in the 2000s

Elections in the 1990s

Elections in the 1980s

Elections in the 1970s

Elections in the 1960s

Elections in the 1950s

Elections in the 1940s

Elections in the 1930s

Elections in the 1920s

Elections in the 1910s

See also 
 List of parliamentary constituencies in London

Notes

References

External links 
Politics Resources (Election results from 1922 onwards)
Electoral Calculus (Election results from 1955 onwards)

Parliamentary constituencies in London
Politics of the London Borough of Wandsworth
Constituencies of the Parliament of the United Kingdom established in 1918
Putney